Memme is a surname. Notable people with the surname include: 

Martina De Memme (born 1991), Italian swimmer
Tanya Memme (born 1971), Canadian actress and television presenter